Yunga may refer to:
 Yunga region of Peru, Bolivia, and northern Argentina
 Yunga District, a district of Peru
 two provinces of Bolivia: Nor Yungas Province and Sud Yungas Province
 Yunga language (Peru)
 Yunga language (Australia)
 Yunga people (Australia), an ethnic group

See also
 Yungas Cocalera Revolution, a political group in Bolivia
 Yungas Road, a cycle route in Bolivia

Language and nationality disambiguation pages